Lišany is name of several places in the Czech Republic:

 Lišany (Louny District), a village in Ústí nad Labem Region
 Lišany (Rakovník District), a village in Central Bohemian Region